Fangataufa (or Fangatafoa) is an uninhabited coral atoll in the eastern part of the Tuamotu Archipelago in French Polynesia.  The atoll has been fully-owned by the French state since 1964. From 1966 to 1996 it was used as a nuclear test site by the French government. In total, 4 atmospheric and 10 underground nuclear explosions were carried out on the atoll.

Geography
The seamount was formed 33.4 - 34.7 million years ago by the Pitcairn hotspot.

The access channel is marked, on each side, by two beacons. There is an abandoned airfield, built to accommodate medium size transport aircraft, on the NE coast of the atoll.

History
The first recorded European to arrive at Fangataufa Atoll was Frederick William Beechey in 1826, who gave it the name "Cockburn island" in honour of George Cockburn.

Nuclear test site

Occasionally occupied during the 20th century, the atoll was selected by France in 1963 for use as a nuclear test site to replace Reggane and In Ecker in the Algerian Sahara. Along with Mururoa, it was formally ceded to France by the Territorial Assembly in 1964.

The first nuclear test at Fangataufa was Rigel, an atmospheric test, conducted on 24 September 1966. This was followed by three more atmospheric tests, including Canopus, France's first two-stage thermonuclear test, on 24 August 1968. The last atmospheric test was Orion, on 2 August 1970.

Following increasing criticism from Pacific countries, France switched to underground testing. Preparations began in 1974, and the first test, Achille, was carried out on 5 June 1975. This was followed by a second test, Hector, on 30 November 1975. Testing then moved exclusively to Mururoa until 1988, when growing safety concerns around the stability of Muroroa's atoll saw some testing move to Fangataufa. Eight further underground tests were conducted on the atoll, with the final one, Xouthos occurring on 27 January 1996.

Since 1998
Today, Fangataufa serves as a wildlife sanctuary for various species of birds. It is permanently uninhabited, and is classified as a Common Military Zone. The zone includes the lagoon areas enclosed by the atoll and by baselines linking the closest points emerging from the reef on both sides of the channel. Entry is prohibited without authorization. The atoll has been the subject of radiological monitoring since 1998 with an annual environmental sampling campaign carried out by Defense personnel and the Atomic Energy Commission (CEA).

In February 2006 an inquiry by the French Polynesian government found that the French government had lied to the local population about the effects of atmospheric testing. On 15 October 2006, the Assembly of French Polynesia adopted a report on the consequences of nuclear testing which concluded that “nuclear testing has had a major impact on health, the environment, society and the Polynesian economy”. The Economic, Social and Cultural Council at the start of this report recommends that “the State recognizes the nuclear fact and assumes its full responsibility accordingly”. In November 2008 the French government agreed to compensate military personnel involved in the tests.

In February 2021, the French National Institute of Health and Medical Research INSERM published a report  entitled "Nuclear tests and health - Consequences in French Polynesia". The objective of this study was to establish an assessment of the available international scientific knowledge on the health consequences of the atmospheric nuclear tests conducted by France in French Polynesia, on the general population and former civilian and military workers.

Administration
Administratively Fangataufa Atoll is part of the commune of Tureia, which includes the atolls of Tureia, Moruroa, Tematangi and Vanavana.

In January 2012 French Polynesian President Oscar Temaru called for the return of Fangataufa and Mururoa. A bill to return the atolls by Senator Richard Tuheiava passed the Senate of France in 2012, but had not yet been debated by the French National Assembly by the time it was meant to take effect in 2014.

See also 
force de frappe

References

External links
  Archives sur le Centre d'Expérimentations Nucléaires du Pacifique (C.E.P.) à Mururoa, Hao et Fangataufa

Atolls of the Tuamotus
Nuclear test sites
French nuclear test sites
Former populated places in Oceania